Katie Anderson may refer to:

Katie Anderson (athlete) (born 1968), Canadian-Jamaican hurdler and four-time Olympian
Katie Anderson, a child actress portraying Poppy Kettle in the British children's television series Tracy Beaker Returns
Katy Anderson, fictional character in Andy Hardy's Blonde Trouble

See also
Kate Anderson (disambiguation)
Katherine Anderson (disambiguation)